Roger Wendell Bowen (May 25, 1932 – February 16, 1996) was an American comedic actor and novelist, best known for his portrayal of Lt. Col. Henry Blake in the 1970 film M*A*S*H.

Bowen considered himself a writer who only moonlighted as an actor. He wrote eleven novels (including Just Like a Movie) as well as sketches for Broadway and television. He was also one of the co-founders of Chicago's comedy and acting troupe The Second City.

Life and career
A native of Providence, Rhode Island, Bowen majored in English at Brown University, then attended graduate school at the University of Chicago. While writing theater reviews for The Chicago Maroon, he was asked to pen material for an improvisational troupe that included Alan Arkin and Mike Nichols. The troupe, Compass Players, evolved into The Second City. Bowen spent most of the 1960s playing "preppie" types on a number of TV & radio commercials. His first film role was 1968's Petulia, but his big movie break came in 1970 when he landed the role of Lieutenant Colonel Henry Blake in Robert Altman's film M*A*S*H. Bowen had in fact served in the U.S. Army in Korea, albeit after the Korean War had ended. (After serving in Japan as a Special Agent in the Counter Intelligence Corps (441st CIC Detachment – Bepu Field Office) from 1957–58, Bowen was sent to the 308th CIC Detachment in Seoul, South Korea in 1958.)

After M*A*S*H, Bowen returned to television and gained a fan following as Hamilton Majors Jr., the pleasantly snooty and supportive Ivy League boss of Herschel Bernardi on the TV sitcom Arnie (1970–72).  He then joined the cast of The Brian Keith Show, and returned to TV commercials and smaller movie roles. In 1976, Bowen appeared in the TV parody film Tunnel Vision, doing a convincing Henry Kissinger impersonation that he was often asked to  perform at parties around Hollywood. (The film featured a galaxy of comic stars including Chevy Chase, John Candy, Howard Hesseman and Joe Flaherty, but Bowen  received top billing as the others were still relatively unknown at the time.) Bowen also played minor roles in such films as Heaven Can Wait (1978), The Main Event (1979) and Zapped! (1982).

Bowen was a tournament chess player who participated in several events in the 1970s. In the early 1980s, Bowen enjoyed another round of weekly TV work with recurring roles on House Calls (starring former M*A*S*H sitcom alumnus Wayne Rogers), At Ease, and Maggie Briggs. He made his final credited film appearance in the 1991 comedy What About Bob? starring Bill Murray and Richard Dreyfuss.

Death
Bowen died of a heart attack at the age of 63 while on vacation in Marathon, Florida.  His death came one day after that of McLean Stevenson, who played Blake for the first three seasons of the M*A*S*H television series.

Filmography

Bibliography

References

External links
 

1932 births
1996 deaths
20th-century American comedians
20th-century American male actors
20th-century American male writers
20th-century American novelists
Actors from Providence, Rhode Island
American male comedians
American male film actors
American male novelists
American male television actors
Brown University alumni
Military personnel from Rhode Island
United States Army personnel of the Korean War
United States Army soldiers
University of Chicago alumni
Writers from Providence, Rhode Island